Vazira Naka is a neighbourhood in the Borivali (West) suburb of Mumbai. The key landmarks are Ganesha temple & Don Bosco School.
Vazira Naka is around 15 minutes from Borivali railway station.

Borivali